This is a list of rural localities in Ingushetia. The Republic of Ingushetia, also referred to as simply Ingushetia, is a federal subject of the Russian Federation (a republic), located in the North Caucasus region.

Dzheyrakhsky District

Malgobeksky District

Sunzhensky District

See also 
 
 Lists of rural localities in Russia

References 

Ingushetia